Jean-Louis Levasseur (born June 16, 1949), also known as Louis Levasseur, is a Canadian retired professional ice hockey goaltender who played in one National Hockey League game for the Minnesota North Stars during the 1979–80 season. He also spent parts of four seasons in the World Hockey Association (WHA) with the Minnesota Fighting Saints, Edmonton Oilers, New England Whalers, and Quebec Nordiques between 1975 and 1979.

Career statistics

Regular season and playoffs

See also
 List of players who played only one game in the NHL

References

External links
 

1949 births
Living people
Binghamton Dusters players
Canadian expatriate ice hockey players in the United States
Canadian ice hockey goaltenders
Edmonton Oilers (WHA) players
Sportspeople from Rouyn-Noranda
Johnstown Jets players
Minnesota Fighting Saints players
Minnesota North Stars players
New England Whalers players
Oklahoma City Stars players
Ontario Hockey Association Senior A League (1890–1979) players
Quebec Nordiques (WHA) players
Springfield Indians players
Tulsa Oilers (1964–1984) players
Ice hockey people from Quebec
Undrafted National Hockey League players